Green Bay-Titirangi United was a football (soccer) club in West Auckland, New Zealand.

It participated in lower divisions of the Northern League between 1978 and 1982
and again between 1988 and 1997, often without much success.

Their most famous player was Danny Hay who played for Leeds United, Walsall and the New Zealand Knights amongst others. He also appeared for the New Zealand national football team, the All Whites.

Green Bay/Titirangi amalgamated with Blockhouse Bay in 1998 to become Bay Olympic.

External links
The Ultimate New Zealand Soccer Website
Bay Olympic History

Defunct association football clubs in New Zealand
Association football clubs in Auckland
1973 establishments in New Zealand
1998 disestablishments in New Zealand
Association football clubs established in 1973